Cambridge Grove is a neighborhood established in 1996.  It is located in the northern part of Cobb County, Georgia, off North Booth Road. It is a small subdivision with 156 single family homes. It is a swim & tennis community with a homeowner association.  Cambridge Grove is in walking distance to Chalker Elementary School and Palmer Middle School.

Schools
Cambridge Grove is in the Cobb County School District.

Elementary school: Chalker Elementary School
Middle school: Palmer Middle School
High school: Kell High School

External links
Cobb County Schools web site

Geography of Cobb County, Georgia
Kennesaw, Georgia
Neighborhoods in Georgia (U.S. state)
1996 establishments in Georgia (U.S. state)